Anne de La Tour d'Auvergne (1496–1524) was sovereign Countess of Auvergne from 1501 until 1524, and Duchess of Albany by marriage to John Stewart, Duke of Albany. In her marriage contract, she was called 'Anne de Boulogne fille de Jehan Comte de Boulogne et Auvergne.'

Family

She was the eldest of two daughters born to Jean III of la Tour d'Auvergne and Jeanne of Bourbon. Her younger sister was Madeleine de La Tour d'Auvergne, who would marry Lorenzo II de' Medici and become the mother of Catherine de' Medici. As the elder daughter, Anne was her father's heiress.

Marriage
On 13 July 1505, she married her first cousin John Stewart, Duke of Albany, the intermittent heir presumptive to the Kingdom of Scotland and its sometime-regent, who lived in France as a sort of exile.

Death and inheritance
Anne died in 1524 at her castle of Saint-Saturnin, leaving her inheritance (the feudal county of Auvergne) to her niece, Catherine de' Medici (born 1519), daughter of her late younger sister Madeleine and Lorenzo II, Duke of Urbino.

A manuscript detailing Anne's inheritance, with pictures of her castles in Auvergne, and her descent from the legendary Belle Moree, daughter of a Pharaoh, survives in the Royal Library of the Hague. The Bibliothèque nationale de France has another manuscript version of this fabulous genealogy, and a similar inventory of Auvergne castles made for Catherine de' Medici. Anne and the Duke of Albany were painted in a stained-glass window at Vic-le-Comte.

Ancestry

References

Sources

 Coombs, B., 'The Artistic Patronage of John Stuart, Duke of Albany, 1518-19: The 'Discovery' of the Artist and Author, Bremond Domat', The Proceedings of the Society of Antiquaries of Scotland, 144 (2014).
 Coombs, B., 'The Artistic Patronage of John Stuart, Duke of Albany, 1520-1530: Vic-le-Comte, the Last Sainte-Chapelle', Proceedings of the Society of Antiquaries of Scotland, 147 (2017).

1496 births
1524 deaths
Dukes of Auvergne
Anne
Anne
Auvergne, Countess of, Anne de La Tour
Albany
16th-century women rulers
15th-century French people
15th-century French women
16th-century French people
16th-century French women